Eugene Lavon Banks (born May 15, 1959) is an American former professional basketball player. He was born and raised in Philadelphia.

High school career and college recruitment

A 6'7" forward, Banks attended high school in West Philadelphia. Nicknamed "Tinkerbell," Banks was named to high school All-American teams his last three years of high school. By his senior year, he was considered one of the best players in the country, along with such players as Albert King and Magic Johnson. Banks was voted MVP of the 1977 Dapper Dan and named to the inaugural McDonald's All American team; there was not yet a designated McDonald's game, but Banks was named MVP when the McDonald's team played in the 1977 Capital Classic.

Banks' decision to attend Duke University surprised close observers of amateur basketball. Recruited by virtually all colleges with major basketball programs, Banks was widely expected to choose to play for a winning program with a record of recruiting black players. UCLA and Villanova were considered the favorites. Banks has said that the only reason he even went on a recruiting visit to Duke was that a high school teacher had repeatedly emphasized Duke's academic opportunities. At the same time, Duke was a southern, small-town college that had never successfully recruited an elite black basketball player. In addition, while the Blue Devils had been to 3 Final Fours in the 1960s, the basketball program had been floundering and had just finished a losing season in which it finished last in the Atlantic Coast Conference.

College basketball career

At Duke, Banks started as a freshman alongside such players as Mike Gminski, Jim Spanarkel, and Kenny Dennard. After finishing last in the conference the prior year, the Blue Devils were ranked in the top 10 by the end of the regular season. Qualifying for the NCAA tournament for the first time in a dozen years, the Blue Devils reached the championship game in 1978, losing to Kentucky, 94–88. During that rookie season, Banks became the first Duke freshman to record a triple double and was named the Atlantic Coast Conference (ACC) Rookie of the Year.

Banks' teams never again made it to the Final Four, though they did qualify for the NCAA tournament during two of the next three years. The team's overall record during his 4 years was 90–37. During the course of his 4-year Duke career, Banks averaged 16.8 points, 7.9 rebounds, and shot 53% from the field. During those final three seasons, Banks was named team MVP each year.

During his senior season, playing for Mike Krzyzewski, Banks won the ACC scoring title over such players as James Worthy and Ralph Sampson. He was named to All American teams after two of his seasons.

Banks is widely seen as a crucial recruit as Duke slowly transitioned into the world of integrated college basketball. While the sixth African American player in Duke's history, he was the school's first Black All American, setting the stage for Coach Krzyzewski's later recruiting success.

Banks received his BA in English from Duke in May 1981, where he was one of the two graduation speakers selected from the student body.

Professional basketball

Banks played six seasons and 468 games in the National Basketball Association. Competing for the San Antonio Spurs and the Chicago Bulls, he averaged 11.3 points per game. His career high of 44 points was achieved against the Los Angeles Lakers in 1983. He recorded his first NBA triple-double with the Chicago Bulls.

In the 1988–89 season, Banks played in Italy for Arimo Bologna. He went from Italy to continue his career as a member of the Maccabi Rishon Lezion basketball club in Israel. In 1993, he continued his play in Israel as a member of Hapoel Herzliya and took them to the Israeli Cup Championship game.

Between these stints, Banks played the 1989–90 season with the La Crosse Catbirds of the Continental Basketball Association (CBA), averaging 15.3 points in 40 games.  The Catbirds would go on to win the CBA title that year.

Coaching
In 2009, Gene Banks became an assistant coach with the Washington Wizards.
In 2012, Banks was reassigned from assistant coach with the Wizards to scout of the southern region of the eastern Atlantic Coast. He is credited with the development of such players as JaVale McGee, Andray Blatche and Kevin Seraphin.

Honors
Banks was inducted into the Duke Basketball Hall of Fame in 1994, and the Duke Hall of Honors in 1996.

In 2007, Banks was named the "best foreign player" to ever play for Maccabi Rishon LeZion.

NBA career statistics

Regular season 

|-
| style="text-align:left;"| 
| style="text-align:left;"|San Antonio
| 80 || 4 || 21.3 || .477 || .000 || .684 || 5.1 || 1.8 || .7 || .2 || 9.6
|-
| style="text-align:left;"| 
| style="text-align:left;"|San Antonio
| 81 || 81 || 33.6 || .550 || .000 || .705 || 7.6 || 3.4 || 1.0 || .3 || 14.9
|-
| style="text-align:left;"| 
| style="text-align:left;"|San Antonio
| 80 || 66 || 32.5 || .568 || .167 || .741 || 7.3 || 3.2 || 1.3 || .3 || 13.1
|-
| style="text-align:left;"| 
| style="text-align:left;"|San Antonio
| 82 || 41 || 25.5 || .586 || .333 || .774 || 5.4 || 2.9 || .8 || .2 || 9.5
|-
| style="text-align:left;"| 
| style="text-align:left;"|Chicago
| 82 || 33 || 26.1 || .517 || .000 || .718 || 4.4 || 3.1 || 1.0 || .1 || 10.9
|-
| style="text-align:left;"| 
| style="text-align:left;"|Chicago
| 63 || 39 || 28.9 || .539 || .000 || .767 || 4.9 || 2.7 || .8 || .3 || 9.7
|- class="sortbottom"
| style="text-align:center;" colspan="2"| Career
| 468 || 264 || 27.9 || .539 || .043 || .730 || 5.8 || 2.9 || .9 || .2 || 11.3

Playoffs 

|-
|style="text-align:left;"|1982
|style="text-align:left;”|San Antonio
|9||–||16.2||.462||.000||.400||4.8||1.0||.4||.3||7.1
|-
|style="text-align:left;"|1983
|style="text-align:left;”|San Antonio
|11||–||36.2||.507||–||.657||6.9||4.5||1.0||.1||15.9
|-
|style="text-align:left;"|1985
|style="text-align:left;”|San Antonio
|1||0||10.0||.000||–||–||.0||1.0||.0||.0||.0
|-
|style="text-align:left;"|1986
|style="text-align:left;”|Chicago
|3||0||23.0||.556||.000||.500||3.3||1.7||.3||.0||7.3
|-
|style="text-align:left;"|1987
|style="text-align:left;”|Chicago
|3||3||26.3||.591||–||.625||2.7||.7||.0||.0||10.3
|- class="sortbottom"
| style="text-align:center;" colspan="2"| Career
| 27 || 3 || 26.0 || .504 || .000 || .596 || 5.1 || 2.5 || .6 || .1 || 10.8

References

External links

Career statistics at Basketball-Reference
Gene Banks' bio on the Wizards site at nba.com

1959 births
Living people
20th-century African-American sportspeople
21st-century African-American people
African-American basketball coaches
African-American basketball players
All-American college men's basketball players
American expatriate basketball people in Israel
American expatriate basketball people in Italy
American men's basketball players
Basketball coaches from Pennsylvania
Basketball players from Philadelphia
Chicago Bulls players
Duke Blue Devils men's basketball players
Fortitudo Pallacanestro Bologna players
Israeli Basketball Premier League players
La Crosse Catbirds players
Maccabi Rishon LeZion basketball players
McDonald's High School All-Americans
Parade High School All-Americans (boys' basketball)
San Antonio Spurs players
San Antonio Spurs draft picks
Small forwards
Shooting guards
Washington Wizards assistant coaches
West Philadelphia High School alumni